The Ray Society is a scientific text publication society that publishes works devoted principally to British flora and fauna. As of 2019, it had published 181 volumes. Its publications are predominantly academic works of interest to naturalists, zoologists, botanists and collectors.

The society was founded in 1844, largely on the initiative of George Johnston and named after the naturalist John Ray (1627–1705). It is based at the Natural History Museum, London, and is a registered charity under English law.

Publications
The Ray Society's publications are concerned with natural history, and have special but not exclusive reference to British flora and fauna. They include original monographs on particular groups and topics, facsimiles of historically important volumes and translations of existing works.

During Charles Darwin's lifetime, the Ray Society published not only Darwin's two volumes on living barnacles (1851 and 1854) but also the work of many of the foremost British naturalists: Thomas Henry Huxley, William Crawford Williamson, John Blackwall, Albert Günther, James Scott Bowerbank, etc.

Recent publications have included:

 (in 2 volumes)

A complete list of all volumes is available on the Society's website.

References

External links

British biology societies
Charities based in England
Scientific organizations established in 1844
Text publication societies
1844 establishments in the United Kingdom